Isoetes malinverniana, the Piedmont quillwort, is a species of quillwort. It is critically endangered.

Distribution 
It is found in Italy.  There is a breeding program to aid conservation.

Taxonomy 
It was named by Vincenzo de Cesati and Giuseppe De Notaris, in  Index Seminum (GE, Genuensis) 1858: 36 in 1858.

References

External links 

malinverniana
Taxa named by Vincenzo de Cesati